Bolax was a town of Triphylia in ancient Elis. Bolax surrendered to Philip V of Macedon in the Social War.

Its site is unlocated.

References

Populated places in ancient Elis
Former populated places in Greece
Triphylia
Lost ancient cities and towns